The Broken Head Nature Reserve is a protected nature reserve located in the Northern Rivers region of New South Wales, Australia, adjacent to the promontory of Broken Head which lies approximately 9 km south of Cape Byron, the easternmost point of Australia. The  reserve contains an intact segment of littoral rainforest. Much of the Australian littoral rainforests have been destroyed for agriculture, mining or housing. Species of tree include Tuckeroo, Broad-leaf Lilly Pilly, Native Elm, Pear Fruited Tamarind, Bennett's Ash, Bangalow Palm, Rusty Rose Walnut and Hoop Pine. The extremely rare Scented Acronychia may naturally occur here. Climbers such as Whip Vine and Lawyer Cane are very common. The weed lantana is a serious problem in disturbed areas. The area is noted for its Aboriginal culture, rainforest walks, whale watching, and fishing from pristine beaches.

Unforgettable scenes can be experienced in this national park. You can see a whale passing by or a sea eagle diving for a fish.

See also

 Protected areas of New South Wales

References 

Nature reserves in New South Wales
Northern Rivers
Forests of New South Wales
Byron Bay, New South Wales